Para-athletics is the sport of athletics practised by people with a disability as a parasport. The athletics events within the parasport are mostly the same as those available to able-bodied people, with two major exceptions in wheelchair racing and the club throw, which are specific to the division. The sport is known by various names, including disability athletics, disabled track and field and Paralympic athletics. Top-level competitors may be called elite athletes with disability.

Competitors are typically organised into three broad categories: deaf sports, athletes with a physical disability, and athletes with an intellectual disability. Deaf athletes typically compete among themselves, while athletes with physical and intellectual disabilities are usually assessed and given a para-athletics classification, which groups together athletes with similar ability levels. These classifications are governed by the International Paralympic Committee (IPC) and comprise a single letter and a number: T for Track or F for Field, then a number defining the level of ability. In competition, events may take place between athletes of identical class if numbers are sufficient, otherwise a range of similar classes may compete in the same event. The Raza point score system can be used in field events to allow athletes of different abilities to directly compete.

International governance operates outside of the sport's able-bodied governing body World Athletics (until 2019: IAAF) and instead is divided among those categories, with deaf athletics overseen by the International Committee of Sports for the Deaf (CISS), para-athletics for the physical disabled principally governed by the World Para Athletics subcommittee of the IPC, and para-athletics for the intellectually disabled through the International Sports Federation for Persons with Intellectual Disability (INAS). There are also condition-specific organisations, such as the International Dwarf Sports Federation and International Athletics Association for Persons with Down Syndrome. Rules for the sport are adapted from those set forth by the World Athletics, with the majority of rules for para-athletics being the same as those for able-bodied competitions, with exceptions that account for competitors' abilities, such as a visual signal instead of a starting pistol in races for the deaf.

Paralympic athletics has been one of the sports at the Paralympic Games since 1960, though deaf athletes and athletes with an intellectual disability compete separately at the Deaflympics and Special Olympics World Games, respectively. The three major sport-specific world championships for para-athletics are the World Para Athletics Championships, the World Deaf Athletics Championships and the INAS World Athletics Championships. Other major para-athletics competitions are hosted within the IWAS World Games and the INAS Global Games. 

The name of the sport is derived from a portmanteau of the words Paralympic and athletics – the former term itself is a portmanteau of the words paraplegic and Olympic, though it now describes athletics for all disabilities. Some para-athletics competitors (in particular deaf, visually impaired, and amputee athletes) also compete in the able-bodied division of the sport, though competitions with a mix of elite disabled and able-bodied athletes are not typically classed as para-athletics.

Classification

Competitors at elite level competitions are classified by disability, to arrange athletes with a similar disability in the same event. A classified T12 athlete for example, is a track athlete with a visual impairment.

F = Field athletes
T = Track athletes
11–13 – Visual impairment. 11 and 12 compete with a sighted guide.
20 – Intellectual impairment
31–38 – Cerebral palsy
40-41 athletes with dwarfism
42–46 – Amputation, and others
51–57 – Wheelchair

In wheelchair racing, athletes compete in lightweight racing chairs.  Most major marathons have wheelchair divisions and the elite racers consistently beat the runners on foot.

Events
Paralympic athletes compete in the following events. Note that not all events may feature at a particular tournament, and not all events may be open to all classifications:

Grand Prix

In 2017 rename from IPC Athletics Grand Prix to World Para Athletics Grand Prix. Its purpose is the development of this sport as well as the classification and obtaining the Paralympic quota. An annual series of elite track and field athletic competitions comprising six to nine of the best athletics meetings.

Source:

https://www.paralympic.org/athletics/about

Since 2013 an annual Grand Prix season.

Since 2016 wheelchair racers as part of the World Marathon Majors series.

https://www.paralympic.org/athletics/grand-prix-2013 - 7 Meetings
https://www.paralympic.org/athletics/grand-prix-2014 - 9 Meetings
https://www.paralympic.org/athletics/grand-prix-2015 - 9+1 Meetings
https://www.paralympic.org/athletics/grand-prix-2016 - 9+1 Meetings
https://www.paralympic.org/athletics/grand-prix-2017 - 9 Meetings
https://www.paralympic.org/athletics/grand-prix-2018 - 9 Meetings
https://www.paralympic.org/athletics/grand-prix-2019 - 9 Meetings
https://www.paralympic.org/athletics/grand-prix-2020 - 9 Meetings (all of events have been cancelled) https://www.paralympic.org/news/world-para-athletics-2020-season-status-update
https://www.paralympic.org/athletics/grand-prix-2021 - 6 Meetings
https://www.paralympic.org/athletics/grand-prix-2022 - 7 Meetings
https://www.paralympic.org/athletics/grand-prix-2023 - 6 Meetings

See also
Athletics at the Summer Paralympics
World Para Athletics Championships
World Para Athletics Junior Championships
Diamond League
Para-athletics in Cameroon
Ajeet Singh Yadav

References

External links
 Paralympic athletics at IPC web site
 

 
Athletics
Athletics by type